Death Triangle, a professional wrestling trio in All Elite Wrestling.

Death Triangle may also refer to:

 American death triangle, a dangerous type of climbing anchor
 Ukrainian Death Triangle, a concept in Ukrainian historiography

See also
 Triangle of Death